BNF may refer to:

Science
 Backus–Naur form, a formal grammar notation in computer science
 Biological nitrogen fixation
 British National Formulary, a drug reference manual

Organisations
 British Nutrition Foundation, a charity
 Bibliothèque nationale de France (BnF), the French national library

Political parties
 Balawaristan National Front, Pakistan
 Belarusian National Front
 BPF Party, break-away group from 1993
 Botswana National Front

Other uses
 Big Name Fan, a well-known fan